Baye Kola (also Romanized as Bāye‘ Kolā; also known as Bā’ī Kolā, Bāy Kalā, and Bāy Kolā) is a village in Rastupey Rural District, in the Central District of Savadkuh County, Mazandaran Province, Iran. At the 2006 census, its population was 55, in 18 families.

References 

Populated places in Savadkuh County